FCI Tallinn (FC Infonet Tallinn) is a football club, based in Lasnamäe, Tallinn, Estonia.

Formed in 2002, the club played in the Estonian top flight Meistriliiga from 2013 to 2017, and won the league in the 2016 season. In 2017, the club merged with Levadia, with the main team and first reserve disbanded, the second reserves, playing in the II Liiga, the fourth level, inherited the club's name.

History
The club was founded in 2002. Before the 2011 season, the club merged with Esiliiga club FC Atletik. They finished the 2011 season in second place, but were beaten in the promotion play-offs by Kuressaare 1–5 on aggregate. Infonet won the 2012 Esiliiga season and were promoted to the top tier Meistriliiga. Infonet finished its first season in the Estonian top division with 6th place.

On 13 July 2015, Infonet beat amateur side Virtsu 36–0 in a 2015–16 Estonian Cup match, equalling Arbroath's 130-year-old record for the largest margin of victory.

Infonet made their European debut in the 2016–17 UEFA Europa League, but were defeated by Scottish Heart of Midlothian 3–6 on aggregate in the first qualifying round.

Infonet won their first Meistriliiga title in the 2016 season, amassing 80 points.

After the 2017 season, it was announced that the club would merge with Levadia and be automatically relegated to the II liiga.

Stadium
The club's home ground was the Infonet Lasnamäe Stadium, also known as the Lasnamäe KJH Stadium. The stadium was built in 2003 and resurfaced in 2016. It has a capacity of 500. The team played their UEFA matches at A. Le Coq Arena.

Players

Reserves and academy

Personnel

Managerial history

Honours
 Meistriliiga
Champions: 2016
 Esiliiga
Winners: 2012
Estonian Cup
Winners: 2016–17
 Estonian Supercup
Winners: 2017

Statistics

League and Cup

Europe

References

External links

 Official website

 
Meistriliiga clubs
Association football clubs established in 2002
2002 establishments in Estonia
Football clubs in Tallinn